Phostria aterrimalis is a moth in the family Crambidae. It was described by George Hampson in 1918. It is found in Cameroon.

The wingspan is about 24 mm. The forewings and hindwings are very dark black brown.

References

Phostria
Moths described in 1918
Moths of Africa